Ri Sung-ryool (born 5 December 1942) is a North Korean speed skater. He competed in two events at the 1964 Winter Olympics.

References

External links
 

1942 births
Living people
North Korean male speed skaters
Olympic speed skaters of North Korea
Speed skaters at the 1964 Winter Olympics
People from South Pyongan